Wolfgang Clemen (9 March 1909 in Bonn, Germany – 16 March 1990 in Bad Endorf, Bavaria, Germany) was an eminent German literary scholar who helped reestablish English Studies in Germany after World War II. His father, Paul Clemen, was a well-known art historian.

Biography/Career 
Clemen studied from 1928 to 1934 at the Universities of Heidelberg, Freiburg, Berlin, München, Bonn and Cambridge. Among his academic teachers were Ernst Robert Curtius, Carl Vossler, and Hugo Friedrich. He received his doctorate in 1936 with a doctoral dissertation on Shakespeare’s images, and his post-doctoral degree (Habilitation) with a study of Geoffrey Chaucer. After a short period as Lecturer for literary history at the University of Cologne, he moved to the University of Kiel. From 1946 until 1974, he was chair of English at the University of Munich. In 1953, he was Visiting Professor at Columbia University; in 1964, Visiting Professor at the University of Bristol.

In 1964, Clemen founded the Munich Shakespeare Library, one of the major collections of scholarship on William Shakespeare outside Britain.

Scholarly achievements
Clemen's reputation rests in large part on his monograph on Shakespeare’s Imagery, a revised English translation of his doctoral dissertation published in 1951 with Methuen Publishing in London. However, the English translation of his Habilitation on Geoffrey Chaucer’s early poetry was of similar importance. Until Clemen's study, Chaucer's The House of Fame, The Book of the Duchess, The Parliament of Fowls, and Anelida and Arcite had not been considered to be at the same level of creative mastery as the Canterbury Tales and Troilus and Criseyde. This changed because Clemen could demonstrate that the Middle English author was as independent of his French and Classical sources in his early as in his later poetry.

Select publications
 Shakespeare's Soliloquies  
 The Development of Shakespeare's Imagery
 Das Wesen der Dichtung in der Sicht moderner englischer und amerikanischer Dichter
 Der junge Chaucer / Chaucer's Early Poetry
 Die Tragödie vor Shakespeare 
 Das Drama Shakespeares
 Shakespeares Monologe

Literature
 Frank-Rutger Hausmann, Anglistik und Amerikanistik im Dritten Reich (Frankfurt: Klostermann, 2003), esp. .
 Ina Schabert, ed. Wolfgang Clemen im Kontext seiner Zeit: Ein Beitrag zur Wissenschaftsgeschichte vor und nach dem Zweiten Weltkrieg. Heidelberg: Universitätsverlag Winter, 2009.
 Richard Utz, Chaucer and the Discourse of German Philology (Turnhout: Brepols, 2002), esp. pp. 207–20.

References 

1909 births
1990 deaths
Academic staff of the Ludwig Maximilian University of Munich
German medievalists
Shakespearean scholars
Chaucer scholars
Writers from Bonn
Recipients of the Pour le Mérite (civil class)
20th-century German historians
20th-century German poets
20th-century German dramatists and playwrights
German male dramatists and playwrights
German male poets
Knights Commander of the Order of Merit of the Federal Republic of Germany
Academic staff of the University of Kiel
Corresponding Fellows of the British Academy